The Department of Cooperative Governance and Traditional Affairs (formerly the Department of Provincial and Local Government) was a ministry of the South African government, responsible for the relationship between the national government and the provincial governments and municipalities, and for overseeing the traditional leadership of South Africa's indigenous communities. In December 2009 it was divided into two departments for Cooperative Governance and Traditional Affairs. Dr Nkosazana Clarice Dlamini-Zuma currently serves as the Minister of Cooperative Governance  and Traditional Affairs as appointed on 29 May 2019.

References

External links 
 Department of Cooperative Governance and Traditional Affairs

Cooperative Governance and Traditional Affairs